The Music Bank World Tour is a worldwide live concert tour of South Korean music show Music Bank by the Korean Broadcasting System. The tour stages live performances, featuring multiple K-pop acts, in various locations outside of South Korea. Since July 2011, the Music Bank World Tour has been held in multiple cities across Asia, Europe and Latin America with an estimated global live audience of 200,000.

Background 
Korean Broadcasting System's Music Bank is one of the most popular music programs of South Korea. It is broadcast live on KBS2 domestically since 1998, and is available globally with subtitles on KBS World, including on its official YouTube stream. It is one of the driving forces behind the Korean Wave and has a steady fan base around the world as it remains the most accessible of the major K-pop television shows.

After a two-year hiatus, the tour restarted in 2017 with Singapore and Jakarta as its stops. It was hosted by popular former Music Bank hosts actor Park Bo-gum and Red Velvet's Irene.

Performers

2011

TVXQ
Girls' Generation
Kara
2PM
Beast
4Minute
U-Kiss
Secret
Rainbow
Infinite
Baek Ji-young
Park Hyun-bin
RaNia
IU

2012

 Girls' Generation
 SHINee
 2PM
 BEAST
 4Minute
 Sistar
 T-ara
 U-Kiss

 TVXQ
 Beast
 CNBLUE
 Wonder Girls
 MBLAQ
 f(x)
 Infinite
 IU

 Super Junior
 CNBLUE
 After School
 MBLAQ
 Davichi
 RaNia

2013

 Super Junior
 Eru
 Sistar
 Teen Top 
 2PM
 Beast
 SHINee
 Infinite

 Super Junior
 MBLAQ
 F.T. Island
 Beast
 miss A
 Ailee

2014

 SHINee
 B.A.P
 MBLAQ
 Infinite
 CNBLUE
 Ailee
 M.I.B

 Ailee
 B.A.P
 Beast
 Infinite
 BTS
 Girl's Day
 EXO-K

2015

 Exo
 SHINee
 Sistar
 Apink
 Teen Top
 Got7
 Block B

2017

 BTS
 SHINee
 Mamamoo
 CNBLUE
 Red Velvet

Exo
B.A.P
GFriend
NCT 127
Astro

2018

Taemin
Twice
Wanna One
VIXX
B.A.P.
SF9

EXO
Wanna One
Stray Kids
Taemin
(G)I-DLE
Somi

2019

 F.T. Island
 Ailee
 Twice
 Monsta X
 Seventeen
 NU'EST W

2020

 Twice
 SEVENTEEN
 Monsta X
 Baekhyun
 Jus2

2022

 NCT Dream
 The Boyz
 (G)I-dle
 Ateez
 TXT
 STAYC

2023

 Stray Kids
 The Boyz
 Nmixx
 AB6IX
 Mamamoo
 Enhypen
 Ive
 P1harmony
 Cravity

Tour dates 
{| class="wikitable sortable" style="text-align:center;"
!style="background:#BED5E1;" width="200"| Date
! style="background:#BED5E1;" width="150"| City
! style="background:#BED5E1;" width="150"| Country
! style="background:#BED5E1;" width="200"| Venue
! style="background:#BED5E1;" width="200"| Host(s)
! style="background:#BED5E1;"| Ref.
|- align=center
! colspan="6" | 2011
|-
| July 13, 2011
| Tokyo
| Japan
| Tokyo Dome
|
|
|- align=center
! colspan="6" | 2012
|-
| February 8, 2012
| Paris
| France
| Bercy
|
|
|-
| June 23, 2012
| Hong Kong
| China
| AsiaWorld-Arena
|
|
|-
| November 2, 2012
| Viña del Mar
| Chile
| Quinta Vergara
|
|
|- align=center
! colspan="6" | 2013
|-
| March 9, 2013
| Jakarta
| Indonesia
| Gelora Bung Karno Stadium
|
|
|-
| September 7, 2013
| Istanbul
| Turkey
| Ülker Sports Arena
|
|
|- align=center
! colspan="6" | 2014
|-
| June 7, 2014
| Rio de Janeiro
| Brazil
| HSBC Arena
|
|
|-
| October 30, 2014
| Mexico City
| Mexico
| Mexico City Arena
|
|
|- align=center
! colspan="6" | 2015
|-
| March 28, 2015
| Hanoi
| Vietnam
| Mỹ Đình National Stadium
|
|
|- align=center
! colspan="6" | 2017
|-
|August 4, 2017
|
| Singapore
| Suntec Convention Centre
| rowspan="2" |Park Bo-gum, Irene
| rowspan="2" |
|-
|September 2, 2017
|Jakarta
| Indonesia
|Jakarta International Expo
|- align=center
! colspan="6" | 2018
|-
|March 23, 2018
|Santiago
|Chile
|Movistar Arena
|Park Bo-gum, Jeongyeon
|
|-
|September 15, 2018
|Berlin
|Germany
|Max-Schmeling-Halle
| Park Bo-gum, Jeon So-mi
|
|- align=center
! colspan="6" | 2019
|-
|January 19, 2019
| Hong Kong
| China
| AsiaWorld-Arena
|Park Bo-gum, Dahyun
|
|- align=center
! colspan="6" | 2021
|-
|TBD
|Dubai
|United Arab Emirates
|Coca-Cola Arena
|

|-
|November 12, 2022 
| Santiago
| Chile
| Estadio Monumental David Arellano
|Rowoon
|
|- align=center
! colspan="7" | 2023
|-
|April 8, 2023 
| Paris
| France
| Paris La Défense Arena
|
|

See also 
KBS Song Festival

References 

K-pop concerts
K-pop festivals
Music festivals established in 2011
South Korea annual television specials